Martin Martinov (born 26 March 1950) is a Bulgarian former cyclist. He competed in the individual road race event at the 1976 Summer Olympics.

References

External links
 

1950 births
Living people
Bulgarian male cyclists
Olympic cyclists of Bulgaria
Cyclists at the 1976 Summer Olympics
Place of birth missing (living people)